Maria Gustafsson, also known as Britt, is a Swedish actress, TV producer and author. Her early career as a model and actress culminated with the popular Spanish quiz show, Un, dos, tres... responda otra vez. 
She had the female lead in the series Vivir es lo que importa, and appeared in roughly a dozen films. After studying TV Direction and Production at New York University she worked on the Spanish version of Sesame Street and was the International Coordinator of 3, 2, 1 Contact, both coproduced with Children's Television Workshop. She was the creator and executive producer of Dinamo, a TV program for the young showing pop/rock musicians exercising extreme sports, broadcast by the Public Spanish TV. Later she became Program Director at Canal 10, the first private TV Channel in Spain, broadcasting from London. 
As Manager and Executive Producer at The Missing Piece, she produced the long-running series Apaños and Viejos Oficios for the different Authonomic TV channels in Spain, and co-produced the youth series Torch with BBC and Checoslovaque TV, and Griot, a documentary series entirely shot in Senegal and the Ivory Coast, with the latter.
She has published five books, the trilogy about Klara Andersson, a Swedish interpreter recruited by the Military Secret Service, Den vidunderliga utsikten, Huset på Carrera 10 and Absintängeln. She has participated in an anthology, Liv och död i Stockholm and co-authored a novel under pseudonym.

She was married to Spanish director Miguel Lluch.

References

Living people
Year of birth missing (living people)